Media Technology and Society: A History from the Telegraph to the Internet is a 1998 book by Brian Winston. The book's central thesis is that technology, rather than developing in relatively discontinuous revolutions, evolves as part of a larger evolutionary pattern. It was named 'Best Book of 1998' by the American Association for History and Computing.

The book contains examples of ways in which technology, human behaviour and society are interconnected.  Through historical accounts, Winston demonstrates how technology reinforces social trends, and how social conditions lead to specific inventions.  It is not an academic work, but instead was written to be read by the general public.

References

External links
WorldCat report

1998 non-fiction books
History books about technology
Technology books
Routledge books
Science and technology studies works